Irina Khmelevskaya-Samoylova (born July 19, 1968) is a Soviet sprint canoer who competed in the late 1980s and early 1990s. At the 1988 Summer Olympics in Seoul, she finished fourth in the K-4 500 m event and fifth in the K-2 500 m event. Competing for the Unified Team at the 1992 Summer Olympics in Barcelona, she finished ninth in the K-4 500 m event while being eliminated in the semifinals of the K-2 500 m event.

References
Irina Khmelevskaya's profile at Sports Reference.com

1968 births
Canoeists at the 1988 Summer Olympics
Canoeists at the 1992 Summer Olympics
Living people
Olympic canoeists of the Soviet Union
Olympic canoeists of the Unified Team
Soviet female canoeists
Russian female canoeists